Dismissed (or DisMissed) is a reality television show on MTV that premiered in 2001. One person simultaneously takes two others on a date. Each of the daters chooses a place to go (total of 2 places), and the person running the date dismisses the person they like the least. Each of the competing daters also has a time-out card. When used, the card allowed the competitor twenty minutes alone with their date.

An international version called Globally Dismissed aired as well. It was essentially the same show, except each person came from a different country. Dismissed was revamped, and eventually replaced by the series Next.

Reruns of Dismissed have started up again as of October 23, 2006.

Link
Official Website

References 

2000s American reality television series
2001 American television series debuts
American dating and relationship reality television series
MTV game shows
2000s American game shows
Television game shows with incorrect disambiguation